This list contains the mottos of organizations, institutions, municipalities and authorities.

Organizations

National mottos
 List of national mottos

Cultural, philanthropic and scientific
 Amsterdam Zoo:  (Nature is the teacher of art)
 International Expositions:  (Always true)
 Monarchist League of Canada:  (United by fealty)
 Real Academia Española (Royal Spanish Academy):  (Cleans, fixes and gives shine)
 Royal Society:  (On the word of no one)
 South African Museum:  (Africa is always producing some novelty)
 Swedish Academy:  (Talent and taste)

Public service and youth service
4-H: "To make the best better."
 Air Training Corps: Venture, Adventure
 Army Cadet Force: To Inspire and achieve. 
 Boy Scouts: Be Prepared
 Boys' Brigade: Sure and Stedfast (Old spelling)
 Brownies: Lend A Hand
 Civil Air Patrol:  (Always vigilant)
 Cub Scouting Do Your Best
 Girlguiding UK: Be Prepared
 Girls' Brigade: Seek, serve and follow Christ
 Guides: Be Prepared
 National FFA Organization: Learning to Do, Doing to Learn, Earning to Live, Living to Serve
 New Zealand Air Training Corps: We Train to Serve
 St. John Ambulance: For the Faith and For the Service of Mankind

Police and public safety
 Carabineros de Chile: Order and Fatherland
 Chicago Police Department: We Serve and Protect
 Detroit Police Department: Making Detroit a Safer Place to Live, Work, and Visit
 Houston Police Department: Order through law, justice with mercy. 
 Icelandic Police:  (With laws shall lands be built)
 Indonesian National Police: Sanskrit: Rastra Sewakottama (Serving the Nation)
 Los Angeles Airport Police: Serving the Aviation Community
 Los Angeles Police Department: To Protect and to Serve
 Maine State Police:  (Always just)
 Metropolitan Police Service: Working together for a safer London
 Milwaukee Police Department: Be A Force
 Minneapolis Police Department: To Protect with Courage, To Serve with Compassion
 Korean National Police Agency:  (A Friendly and Reliable Police Force for the People )
 New South Wales Police Force:  (Punishment Follows Closely On Guilt) 
 New York Police Department: Fidelis ad Mortem (Faithful unto death)
 Royal Malaysian Police:  (Firm, Fair & Prudent)
 Sacramento County Sheriff: Service with Concern
 Singapore Police Force:  (Loyalty and Service)
 New Zealand Police: Safer communities together
 Thames Valley Police:  (Let there be peace in the Thames Valley)
 Trinity House:  (Trinity in unity)
 United States Department of Veterans Affairs Police: Protecting Those Who Serve
 Victoria Police: Uphold the Right
 Royal Canadian Mounted Police: Maintiens le Droit (Uphold the right)

Sport and competition

International organisations
 Fédération Internationale des Échecs:  (We are one people)
 International Practical Shooting Confederation:  (Accuracy, power, speed)
 Olympic Games:  (Faster, higher, stronger)
 Paralympic Games: Spirit in Motion

Africa and Asia
 Al-Quwa Al-Jawiya:  (Character, Faith, Force)
 Asante Kotoko S.C.: Ashanti  (Kill a thousand, and a thousand more will come)
Kolkata Knight Riders: Korbo, Lorbo, Jeetbo re (Will do, will fight, will win)

Americas
 Carolina Panthers: Keep Pounding
 Chicago Fire SC: Tradition. Honor. Passion.
 Colo Colo:  (The team that has known to become champion)
 CR Flamengo:  (Once Flamengo, always Flamengo)
 Tabor Academy:  (Truth always conquers)

Australia
 Adelaide Football Club:  (Born to great things)
 Carlton Football Club:  (Sound Mind in a Healthy Body)
 Collingwood Football Club:  (May the Magpie flourish)
 Essendon Football Club:  (Gently in manner, resolutely in execution)
 Footscray Football Club:  (Yield to none)
 Hawthorn Football Club:  (Judged by our actions)
 North Melbourne Football Club:  (Victory demands dedication)
 Port Adelaide Football Club: We Are Port Adelaide
 St Kilda Football Club:  (Strength through Loyalty)

Europe
 Sport Lisboa e Benfica:  (Out of many, one)
 Feyenoord Rotterdam:  (No words but deeds)
 S.S. Lazio:  (In harmony small things grew)
 Olympique de Marseille: French: Droit au but (Straight to the Goal)
 F.C. Porto: A Vencer desde 1893 (Conquering since 1893)
 Sporting Clube de Portugal:  (Effort, dedication, devotion, glory)
 Real Madrid C.F.:  (Hail Madrid and nothing more)

United Kingdom
 Arsenal F.C.:  (Victory through harmony)
 Aston Villa: Prepared
 Chelsea Football Club: Keep The Blue Flag Flying High
 Everton Football Club:  (Nothing but the best is good enough)
 Leeds United: Marching on Together
 Leicester City: Foxes Never Quit and #Fearless
 Llanelli Wanderers RFC:  (Friendship through wandering)
 Liverpool Football Club: You'll Never Walk Alone
 Manchester City F.C.:  (Pride in battle)
 Norwich City F.C: On the Ball, City
 Queen's Park F.C.:  (To play for the sake of playing)
 Rangers F.C.: Ready
 Sheffield Wednesday F.C.:  (by Wisdom and Courage)
 Shrewsbury Town F.C:  (May Shropshire flourish / Let Salop flourish)
 Stoke City:  (United Strength is Stronger)
 Sunderland A.F.C.:  (In pursuit of excellence)
 Tottenham Hotspur:  (To dare is to do)

Politics
 Chechen Resistance: Ojal ya Marsho (Chechen: Freedom or death)
 Christian Democracy (Italy): Libertas
Committees for the Defense of the Revolution (Cuba): ¡En cada barrio, Revolución! (Spanish: In every neighborhood, Revolution!)
 ETA: Bietan jarrai (Basque: Keep up on both)
Industrial Workers of the World: An injury to one is an injury to all
 La Francophonie: égalité, complémentarité, solidarité (equality, complementarity, and solidarity).
 Liberal Party of the Philippines: Noon at Ngayon, Liberal Marangal (Past and present, honorable Liberal)
 Muslim Brotherhood: Allah Akbar, Wa Lellah Al Hamd (God is greater, thanks to God)
 Nacionalista Party: Ang Bayan Higit sa Lahat (The nation above all)
 Socialistisk Folkeparti: Det ku' være så godt (Danish: It could be so good)
 Universal Negro Improvement Association and African Communities League: One God! One Aim! One Destiny!
 Women's Institute: For Home and Country
 Women's Social and Political Union: Deeds not words
 Zapatista Army of National Liberation: Ya Basta! (Spanish: Enough already!)

Heritage and historical
 Daughters of the American Revolution: God, Home, and Country
 Sons of the American Revolution:  (Liberty and country)
 United Daughters of the Confederacy: Love, Live, Pray, Think, Dare

Religion
 Ahmadiyya Community: Love for All Hatred for None
 Benedictine Order:  (pray and work)
 Carmelite Order:  (I am aflame with zeal for the Lord God of Hosts)
 Cartellverband der katholischen deutschen Studentenverbindungen:  (In need unity, in doubt liberty, in everything charity)
 Dominican Order:  (Truth),  (Praise, bless, preach)
 K.A.V. Lovania Leuven:  (Always do your best);  (The Spirit lives in us all)
 Khuddam-ul Ahmadiyya: A Nation cannot be reformed without the reformation of its youth
 Knights Hospitaller:  (Support the faithful and serve the poor)
 Knights Templar:  (Not to us, Lord, not to us; but your name give glory)
 Lajna Imaillah: No nation can progress without educating their women
 Philippine Independent Church:  (For God and country)
 Pontificate of Pope Pius XII:  (peace is the fruit of justice)
 Pontificate of Pope Francis:  (by having mercy and by choosing)
 Salvation Army: Blood and Fire
 Society of Jesus:  (For the greater glory of God)
 United Church of Christ: That they may all be one.
 United Methodist Church: Open hearts, Open minds, Open doors

Business
 Audi: Vorsprung durch Technik (Literally: Advantage through technology, Figuratively: The technical edge)
 BBC: Nation Shall Speak Peace Unto Nation
 Harrods: Omnia Omnibus Ubique (All Things, For All People, Everywhere)
 IdentLogic Systems:  ( Let him who has earned it bear the reward)
 Metro-Goldwyn-Mayer:  (Art for art's sake)
 Royal Mail Lines:  (Everywhere by sea)

Medieval nobility
Famous mottos, usually deliberately cryptic, adopted during the  age of chivalry and courtly love by great noblemen and ladies include:
À Mon Seul Désir, appearing on The Lady and the Unicorn tapestry made in Paris circa 1500;
Me Sovent Sovant, Lady Margaret Beaufort (1441/3-1509)  (Souvent me souviens, "Often I remember") which was adopted by St John's College, Cambridge, founded by her;
A Vous Entier John of Lancaster, 1st Duke of Bedford (1389-1435);
Le Temps Venra Jean de Berry (1340-1416)
Le Bon Temps Viendra, ("the right time will come") Bourchier family;
Honi Soit Qui Mal Y Pense, King Edward III (ruled 1327–1377) of England, motto of the Order of the Garter (1348);
J'en Garde un Leal, Anne Malet de Graville ((1490?–1540?))

Dynasties
 British monarchy (Plantagenet):  (God and my right / God and my right shall me defend)
 Greek royal family :  (People's love, my strength)
 Hohenzollern-Sigmaringen, House of Romania :  (Nothing without God)
 Pahlavi dynasty :  (Justice He [God] bids me do, as He will judge me)
 Rothschild family:  (Unity, integrity, diligence)
 House of Savoy: FERT
 Royal mottos of Danish monarchs
 List of Norwegian monarchs' mottos
 Royal mottos of Swedish monarchs

Families

Medical
 American Board of Ophthalmology:  (From darkness, light)
 Association of Anaesthetists of Great Britain and Ireland:  (In sleep there is safety)
 Association of Veterinary Surgeons in Bulgaria:  (A scalpel in a wise hand gives life)
 Association of Surgeons of Great Britain and Ireland:  (Let us learn all things from everybody)
 Australian and New Zealand College of Anaesthetists:  (To care for the body and its breath of life)
 Australian College of Pharmacy: Education for Practice and Management
 Canadian Association of General Surgeons:  (Wisdom and a skillful hand)
 Canadian Orthopaedic Association:  (With compassion, skill and knowledge we correct, straighten or set right)
 Grant Medical College, Mumbai, India. Mens sana in corpora sano
 Royal Australasian College of Dental Surgeons:  (Let knowledge conquer disease)
 Royal Australian and New Zealand College of Obstetricians and Gynaecologists: Excellence in women's health
 Royal College of Anaesthetists:  (It is divine to alleviate pain / Divine is the effort to conquer pain)
 Royal College of General Practitioners:  (Scientific knowledge applied with compassion)
 Royal College of Midwives:  (Life is the gift of God)
 Royal College of Obstetricians and Gynaecologists:  (Let us overcome our difficulties)
 Royal College of Ophthalmologists:  (So that all may see)
 Royal College of Paediatrics and Child Health:  (Children are a heritage from the Lord)
 Royal College of Psychiatrists: Let Wisdom Guide
 Royal College of Surgeons in Ireland:  (Scholarship and dexterity)
 Royal Pharmaceutical Society:  (We must pay attention to our health)
 Walter Reed Tropical Medicine Course: Safiri Salama (Swahili: Travel safely)
 ZAKA: Hessed Shel Emet (True kindness)

Other
 Association of Trust Schools:  (In order to achieve what has been undertaken)
 Glasgow Filmmakers Alliance: Whatever the weather, we stand together
 International Thespian Society: Act well your part. There all the honor lies
 Linux Foundation: Open your source, Open your mind
 The Boondock Saints: , alternately  (Truth and justice / Honesty and equality)
 The Red Green Show: Quando omni flunkus moritati  (Pseudo-Latin When all else fails, play dead)

Military and governmental

Canadian Security Intelligence Service:  A safe, secure and prosperous Canada, through trusted intelligence and advice.
Canadian Army: Vigilamus pro te (We stand on guard for thee)
Royal Canadian Air Force: 	Sic Itur ad Astra (Such is the pathway to the stars)
Royal Canadian Navy: Parati vero parati (Ready aye ready)
Canadian Special Operations Forces Command: Facta, non verba (Actions, not words)
Irish Army Cavalry Corps: Through the mud and blood to the green fields beyond
Apollo 13:  (From the Moon, knowledge)
British Special Air Service: Who Dares Wins
Indian Army: Naam, Namak, Nishan (Be honourable, true to your salt, and uphold the flag)
Indian Army Medical Corps: Sarve Santu Niramaya (Everyone should remain healthy, good health for all)
National Security Agency (NSA): Defending Our Nation, Securing The Future
Ontario Regiment of Canada: Canadian Armed Forces Armoured Reserve Regiment:  (Faithful and prepared)
Pakistan Army: Iman, Taqwa, Jihad Fi Sabil-illah, Men at their Best. (Faith, piety, struggle in the way of Almighty Allah, men at their best)
Philippine National Police: We Serve and Protect
Royal Air Force (United Kingdom):  (Through adversity to the stars)
Royal Marines (United Kingdom):  (By sea, by land)
Household Division (United Kingdom):  (Seven joined in one)
United States Air Force Academy: Integrity First, Service before self, Excellence in All we Do
United States Coast Guard (USCG):  (Always ready)
United States Coast Guard Life-Saving Service (USCG LSS): You have to go out, but you don't have to come back 
United States Marine Corps (USMC):  (Always faithful)
United States Military Academy: Duty, Honor, Country
US Air Force Pararescue: That Others May Live
United States Army: This We'll Defend
 Spanish Light Armoured Cavalry Regiment Santiago No 1 :  (My foot has stood in the right way/direction (or in uprightness; in integrity )
 United States Secret Service: Worthy Of Trust and Confidence

Orders and decorations

Canada 
 Order of Canada:  (They desired a better land)
 Order of Military Merit (Canada):  (Service before self)

Europe 
 Legion of Honour (France):  (Honour and Fatherland)
 Order of Charles III (Spain):  (By virtue and merit)
 Order of the Crown (Belgium):  (Work and Progress)
 Order of the Cross of Liberty (Finland):  (For the Fatherland)
 Order of the Dannebrog (Denmark):  (God and the King)
 Order of the Elephant (Denmark):  (The prize of greatness)
 Order of the Golden Fleece (Spanish version):  (Strike before they see the flame)
 Order of the House of Orange (Netherlands):  (I will maintain)
 Order of Leopold (Belgium):  (Union makes strength)
 Order of Leopold II (Belgium):  (Union makes strength)
 Order of Merit for the Fatherland (Russia):  (Benefit, honour and glory)
 Order of the Netherlands Lion:  (Power ennobles)
 Order of Orange-Nassau:  (I will maintain)
 Order of the Polar Star (Sweden):  (It knows no decline)
 Order of Saint Andrew (Russia):  (For faith and loyalty)
 Order of St. George (Russia):  (For service and bravery)
 Order of St. Olav (Norway):  (Justice and truth)
 Order of the Seraphim (Sweden):  (Jesus, saviour of men)
 Order of the Star of Romania:  (In Faith is the Salvation)
 Order of the Tower and Sword (Portugal):  (Valour, Loyalty and Merit)
 Order of the White Eagle (Poland):  (For Fatherland and Nation)
 Order of the White Lion (Czech Republic):  (Truth Prevails)
 Order of the White Rose of Finland:  (For the Well-Being of the Fatherland)

Holy See 
 Order of Pius IX:  (By virtue and merit)
 Order of St. Gregory the Great:  (For God and Prince)
 Order of St. Sylvester:  (Much in a small space)

United Kingdom 
 George Cross: For Gallantry
 Order of the Bath:  (Three joined in one)
 Order of the Garter:  (Shame be to him who thinks evil of it)
 Order of Merit: For Merit
 Order of St Michael and St George:  (Hope of a better age)
 Order of the Thistle:  (No-one injures me with impunity)
 Royal Victorian Order: Victoria
 Victoria Cross: For Valour

Municipalities

Australia

New South Wales
 Blacktown: Progress
 Sydney: I take but I surrender

Northern Territory
 Darwin, Northern Territory:  (Let us go forward)

Queensland
 Brisbane:  (We aim for better things)

South Australia
 Adelaide:  (United for the common good)

Tasmania
 Hobart:  (Thus, in force, Hobart grew)

Victoria
 Melbourne:  (She acquires strength as she goes)

Western Australia 
City of Perth:  (Prosper & Protect)

Canada

British Columbia
 Kamloops Salus et Opes

Manitoba
 Brandon:  (She acquires strength through progress)
 Headingley:  (To go forward prosperously)
 Macdonald:  (To preserve and flourish) 
 Portage la Prairie: 
 St. Andrews: 
 West St. Paul: 
 Winnipeg:  (One with the strength of many)

New Brunswick
 Saint John:  (O fortunate ones whose walls are now rising / O happy they, whose promised walls already rise)

Nova Scotia
 Halifax:  (Wealth from the sea)

Ontario
 Hamilton: Together Aspire, Together Achieve
 Ottawa: Advance Ottawa
 Toronto: Diversity Our Strength
 Sarnia:  (Sarnia Always)

Quebec
 Montreal:  (Salvation through harmony)
 Province of Quebec:  (I remember)
 Quebec City, Quebec:  (I shall put God's gift to good use)

Saskatchewan
 Regina:  (Let Regina flourish)

Europe
 Amsterdam:  (Valiant, Steadfast, Compassionate)
 Bordeaux:  (The fleur-de-lis alone rules over the moon, the waves, the castle, and the lion) 
 Brescia:  (Brescia faithful)
 Bucharest:  (The Homeland and my right)
 Douglas:  (Government within a government)
 Frankfurt:  (Strong in justice)
 Gdańsk:  (Neither rashly nor timidly)
 Gdynia:  (Gdynia—a city built of sea and dreams)
 Genoa:  (Liberty)
 Kaunas:  (Love justice, landlords)
 Łódź:  (Big boat out of a small one)
 Madrid:  (On water I was built, My walls are made of fire, this is my ensign and escutcheon)
 Marseille:  (By her great deeds, Marseille shines in the world)
 Nancy, France:  (I'm not touched with impunity)
 Nantes:  (Neptune favours the traveller)
 Nice:  (City of Nice)
 Oporto, Portugal:  (Antique, highly noble, always faithful, unvanquished Oporto City)
 Paris:  (Tossed by the waves, she does not founder)
 Prague:  (Prague, head of the republic). Formerly: Praga caput regnum (Prague, head of the kingdom)
 Rotterdam:  (Stronger by struggle)
 Seville:  (It [Seville] has not abandoned me)
 Sofia: Raste, no ne staree (Bulgarian: Grows, but does not age)
 The Hague:  (Peace and Justice)
 Toulon:  (Small things increase by concord)
 Toulouse:  (For Toulouse, always more)
 Valletta:  (The most humble city)
 Vilnius:  (Unity, justice, hope)
 Warsaw:  (Always invincible)
 Żebbuġ, Malta:  (Evergreen)

Indonesia
 Jakarta: Jaya Raya (Victory and glorious) 
 Bandung: Gemah Ripah Wibawa Mukti (rich soil, prosperous people)
 Rarasing Rasa Wiwaraning Praja, a Javanese sengkala, (referring to the year of 1966), people's harmonious feeling for entering a gate of prosperity
 Karawang: Pangkal Perjuangan (Struggle starting point)
 Bali: Bali Dwipa Jaya (Glorious Bali Island)
 Aceh : Pancacita (Five purposes)

India
 Kolkatta (Calcutta): Purosree Bibardhan (Bengali: Progress of the city)
 Mumbai: Yato Dharmastato Jaya (यतो धर्मस्ततो जय) (Sanskrit: Where there is righteousness, there shall be victory). Pre-independence motto: Urbs Primis in Indis (India's first city)
 Kerala: Ever To Be The Best (Tolins World School)
Tamil Nadu வாய்மையே வெல்லும் (Tamil) (Truth alone triumphs)

Republic of Ireland
 Cork:  (A safe harbour for ships)
 Dublin:  (Happy the city where citizens obey)
 Dún Laoghaire: Ó Chuan go Sliabh (From the harbour to the mountain)
 Limerick:  (An ancient city well versed in the arts of war)
 Waterford:  (Waterford remains the untaken city)

Latin America
 Nuevo Leon, Mexico:  (Always ascending)
 São Paulo:  (I am not led, I lead)

New Zealand
 Auckland: Advance
 Christchurch:  (Founded in Faith, Rich in the Fulfillment thereof, Strong in Hope for the Future).
 Dunedin:  (By following in the footsteps of our forefathers)
 Nelson, New Zealand:  (Let him, who has earned it, bear the palm)
 Wellington:  (Supreme by position)

United Kingdom

England

Berkshire

 Reading:  (From God and the Queen)
 Slough: Serve with honour
 West Berkshire: Forward together
 Windsor and Maidenhead:  (In unity, happiness)
 Wokingham:  (One out of many)

Buckinghamshire

 Aylesbury Vale:  (Forward in harmony)
 Chiltern: Freely we serve
 High Wycombe:  (Industry enriches)
 Milton Keynes: By knowledge, design, and understanding
 South Buckinghamshire:  (By counsel and courage)

Cambridgeshire

 Huntingdonshire:Labore omnia florent
 Peterborough: Upon this rock
 South Cambridgeshire:  (Not without work)

Cheshire
 Chester:  (Let the ancients worship the ancient of days)
 Borough of Halton:  (Industry fills the ship)
 Runcorn:  (Fill the ship with goods)
 Widnes:  (Industry enriches)

City of London
  (Lord direct us)

Devon

 Exeter:  (Always faithful)
 Plymouth:  (The strongest tower is the name of Jehovah)
 Torquay:  (Health and happiness)

Essex

 Benfleet:  (Fellowship will blossom)
 Braintree: By wisdom and foresight
 Brentwood:  (burning with faith)
 Canvey Island:  (From the sea by the grace of God)
 Chelmsford: Many minds, one heart
 Colchester: No Cross, no Crown
 Great Dunmow: May Dunmow prosper
 Halstead:  (By wisdom and foresight)
 Harwich:  (To the good all things are good)
 Harlow: In Common Endeavour
 Leigh-on-Sea:  (Light, health, happiness)
 Maldon: Vision, courage, integrity
 Rayleigh:  (We work for the future)
 Rochford: Our heritage, our future
 Southend-on-Sea:  (By the sea and by the church)
 Thurrock:  (By the Thames to all peoples of the world)
 Waltham Abbey:  (By the name of the Holy Cross)

Gloucestershire

 Cheltenham:  (Health and education)
 Cirencester:  (May Corinium (Cirencester) flourish)
 Cotswold District: United we serve
 Gloucester:  (Unconquered faith triumphs)
 Gloucestershire:  (Ever forwards)
 Tewkesbury Borough:  (There is wisdom in counsel)

Greater London

 Barking and Dagenham:  (By the grace of God, let us be judged by our acts)
 Barnet:  (Unity makes service)
 Bexley: Boldly and Rightly
 Brent: Forward Together
 Bromley:  (To serve the people)
 Camden:  (Not for oneself, but for all)
 Croydon:  (Let us strive after perfection)
 Ealing: Progress With Unity
 Enfield: By Industry Ever Stronger
 Greenwich: We Govern by Serving
 Hammersmith and Fulham:  (Let us be regarded according to our conduct)
 Haringey: Progress With Humanity
 Harrow:  (The health of the people is the supreme law)
 Havering: Liberty
 Hillingdon: Forward
 Hounslow:  (Let us progress together)
 Islington: We Serve
 Kensington and Chelsea:  (What a good thing it is to dwell together in unity)
 Lambeth:  (Let us be regarded according to our conduct)
 Lewisham:  (The health of the people is the supreme law)
 Merton: Stand Fast In Honour And Strength
 Newham: Progress with the People
 Redbridge: In Unity Progress
 Southwark: United to Serve
 Sutton:  (through difficulties serve God in faith) 
 Tower Hamlets: From Great Things to Greater
 Waltham Forest: Fellowship Is Life
 Wandsworth: We Serve
 Westminster:  (Guard the city, O Lord)

Greater Manchester

 Bolton:  (Overcome difficulties)
 Bury: Forward in unity
 Manchester:  (By counsel and labour)
 Oldham:  (Have courage to be wise)
 Stockport:  ( With courage and faith)
 Tameside: Industry and integrity
 Trafford: Hold fast that which is good
 Wigan: Ancient and Loyal

Hampshire

 New Forest: Old Yet Ever New
 Portsmouth: Heaven's Light Our Guide
 Romsey: Quae Recta Tene
 Rushmoor: Strength in Unity
 Test Valley:  (With God as our witness, let us be strong)

Hertfordshire

 Broxbourne:  (One heart, one way)
 Dacorum: The Borough of Dacorum
 Hertsmere: Do Well And Fear Not
 North Hertfordshire: Memores Acti, Prudentes Futuri
 Stevenage: The Heart of a Town Lies in its People
 Watford:  (Bolder)
 Welwyn Hatfield: By Wisdom And Design

Kent

 Ashford: With Stronger Faith
 Canterbury:  (Hail, Mother England)
 Dartford:  (Let Dartford Flourish)
 Folkestone and Hythe:  (Delightfulness and healthiness)
 Maidstone: Agriculture and Commerce
 Medway: Forward Together
 Swale: Known by their Fruits
 Tonbridge and Malling: Forward in Unison
 Tunbridge Wells: Do Well Doubt Not

Lancashire

 Blackburn:  (By art and labour)
 Blackpool: Progress
 Burnley: Hold to the truth
 Chorley: Be aware
 Fylde:  (Let the field rejoice)
 Hyndburn: By industry and prudence
 Lancashire:  (In council is wisdom)
 Lancaster: Luck to loyne
 Pendle:  (In unity we increasingly flourish)
 Rossendale: Prosperity through endeavour
 South Ribble: Progress with humanity
 West Lancashire: Salus populi suprema lex )
 Wyre:  (On either side of the river)

Leicestershire

 Leicester:  (Always the same)

Lincolnshire

 Mablethorpe:  (Our shores are more delightful) [1]

Merseyside

 Liverpool:  (God hath granted us this ease)

Norfolk

 Norwich: Do different

Northumbria

 Newcastle-upon-Tyne:  (Triumph by brave defence) [5]

Suffolk 

 Felixstowe: Felix sto we (Happy we stand)

Surrey

 Elmbridge:  (Until the rivers cease to flow)
 Epsom and Ewell: None Such
 Guildford:  (Bravely and faithfully)
 Mole Valley:  (Vigilant in our serving)
 Spelthorne:  (We look towards the Sun)
 Surrey Heath:  (Make haste carefully)
 Tandridge:  (Harmony)
 Reigate and Banstead: Never Wonne Ne Never Shall
 Runnymede: In Freedom We Serve
 Waverley:  (Town and countryside in unity)
 Woking:  (In faith and diligence)

Sussex

 Brighton and Hove:  (Between sea and downs we flourish)
 Crawley: I Grow and I Rejoice
 Eastbourne:  (We follow the better things)
 Horsham: Proudly We Serve
 Mid Sussex:  (The good of the people comes first)
 Wealden:  (Rural interior)
 Worthing:  (From the land, fullness; from the sea, health)

West Midlands

 Birmingham: Forward

Yorkshire 
 Bradford: Progress, Industry, Humanity
 Calderdale:  (Industry, Skill, Foresight)
 Leeds:  (For the king and the law)
 Rotherham: By Industry and Honour
 Sheffield:  (With God's help, our work is successful)
 Wakefield: Persevere and Prosper
 Yorkshireman's Motto: 'Ear all, see all, say nowt;Eyt all, sup all, pay nowt;And if ivver tha does owt fer nowt –Allus do it fer thissen.[11]

Scotland
 Aberdeen:  ( Good agreement)
 Arbroath: Propter libertatem (Latin: For Freedom)
 Braemar:  (Make sure)
 Clydebank:  (By work and by knowledge)
 Dingwall: Salve corona
 Duns:  (Duns beats all)
 East Kilbride: Prosper but Dreid
 Edinburgh: Nisi Dominus 
 Falkirk:  (Strike one, strike all - easier fight with the devil than the children of Falkirk)
 Forfar: Ut quocunque paratus
 Galashiels:  (Sour Plums)
 Glasgow: Let Glasgow Flourish
 Irvine:  (The good cause triumphs in the end)
 Jedburgh:  (With vigour and success)
 Kelso:  (Do right — fear nought)
 Kinross:  (Sure)
 Lerwick: Dispecta est et Thule
 Orkney Islands: Boreas domus mare amicus (Latin: The North our home, the sea our friend)
 Perth:  (For the King, the Law and the People)
 Port Glasgow:  (Three and four times a year revisiting the Atlantic with impunity)
 Rosehearty:  (Strive always, Rosehearty)
 St Andrews:  (While I breathe I hope)
 Selkirk: At spreta incolumem vita defendere famam
 Shetland Islands: Með lögum skal land byggja (Norn: By law shall the land be built up) 
 Thurso:  (Walk towards God)

Northern Ireland

County Antrim
 Antrim: Per Angusta ad Augusta
 Ballyclare:  (By work and integrity)
 Ballymoney: Goodwill to all People
 Belfast:  (What shall we give in return for so much)
 Carrickfergus:  (The glory of the Old made New)
 Larne:  (Powerful With the Sickle and on the Sea)
 Lisburn:  (I will arise from the fire)
 Newtownabbey:  (Multi in uno resurgent)

County Armagh

 Armagh: In Concilio Consilium
 Craigavon: Together we progress
 Lurgan: Be just and fear not
 Portadown: ???

County Down

 Ards:  (Faithful and Brave)
 Bangor: Beannchor
 Banbridge:  (By God and Industry)
 East Down: Ever looking forward
 Newtownards: Fidelis atque Fortis

County Fermanagh

 Enniskillen: Ut proavi in Deo confidemus
 Fermanagh: Feor Magh Eanagh

County Londonderry
 Coleraine: Cuil Rathain
 Limavady:  (Let there be no ill-will)
 Derry:  (Life, truth, victory)
 Magherafelt:  (With Faithfulness and Service)
 Moyle:

County Tyrone
 Cookstown: Forward
 Dungannon:
 Omagh: Oigh Magh

Wales
 Cardiff: Y Ddraig Goch Ddyry Cychwyn (Welsh: The red dragon leads the way)
 Merthyr Tydfil: Nid Cadern Ond Brodyrdde (Welsh: No strength but in fellowship)
 Llandudno: Hardd Hafan Hedd (Welsh: Beautiful haven of peace)
 Newport: Terra Marique (By land and sea)

United States

California
 Adelanto: Progress through unity
 Alameda:  (Prosperity from the land and sea)
 Banning: Proud History, Prosperous Tomorrow
 Berkeley: Westward the course of empire takes its way; / The first four Acts already past, / A fifth shall close the Drama with the day; / Time's noblest offspring is the last.
 Carson: Future Unlimited
 Ceres: Together We Achieve
 Del Mar:  (Much in little)
 Downey: Future Unlimited
 Eastvale: Family, Community, Diversity
 El Centro: Shining with Opportunity
 Eureka:  (I have found it)
 Garden Grove:  (Let envy be absent)Gardena: Freeway City
 Half Moon Bay:  (Live, work, play)
 Hanford: Planning Tomorrows
 Kerman: Community Comes First
 Lanare: Building from the Ground Up
 Manhattan Beach: Sun, Sand, Sea
 Millbrae: A Place in the Sun
 Monterey:  (Onward)
 Ontario: Balanced Community
 Orange Cove: Honoring Our Past, Embracing Our Future, Come Grow With Us; In God We Trust
 Paradise: In Harmony with Nature
 Redwood City: Climate Best by Government Test
 Rialto: Bridge to Progress
 San Diego:  (Always vigilant)
 San Francisco:  (Gold in peace, iron in war)
 Santa Fe Springs:  (Let the welfare of the people be the supreme law)
 Upland: Madonna of the Trail

Florida
 Palm Bay: A Perfect Place to Grow

Illinois
 Chicago:  (City in a garden)

Indiana
 East Chicago:  (We progress)
 Fort Wayne: Ke-ki-on-ga
 Hammond: Land of Calumet
 South Bend: Peace
 Valparaiso: Vale of Paradise

Iowa
 State of Iowa: Our liberties we prize and our rights we will maintain

Kentucky
 Campbellsville:  (City in the middle of the commonwealth)

Massachusetts
 Commonwealth of Massachusetts:  (By the sword we seek peace, but peace only under liberty)
 Boston:  (God be with us as He was with our fathers)
 Somerville: Municipal Freedom Gives National Strength

Maryland
 Baltimore: Believe

Michigan
 Detroit:  (We hope for better things; it will rise from the ashes)
 Grand Rapids:  (strength in activity)

Minnesota
 Minneapolis: En Avant (Forward)

North Carolina
North Carolina State Motto:  (To be rather than to seem)

Ohio

 Centerville: Progress, Stability
 Chillicothe:  (Ohio's first capital)
 Cincinnati:  (Unity assists)
 Cleveland: Progress & Prosperity
 Coldwater: The family is our most important product
 Dublin: where yesterday meets tomorrow
 Fairborn: Tradition, Innovation
 Obetz: For Work, For Play, For Everyone
 Parma: Progress Through Partnerships
 Reading:  (We Try Our Best)
 St. Marys: Where Living is a Pleasure;  (City amid fields)
 Streetsboro: Gateway to Progress
 Toledo:  (To work is to pray)
 Union: Sheets Rifle

Oregon
Oregon State Motto: She flies with her own wings
Portland, Oregon: The City that Works

Pennsylvania
 Philadelphia:  (Let brotherly love continue)

Texas
Austin, Texas: Friendship

Virginia
 Virginia State Motto:  (Thus always to tyrants)
 Richmond, Virginia:  (Such is the way to the Stars)

British counties

England

Traditional
 Bedfordshire: Constant Be
 Buckinghamshire:  (No stepping back)
 Cambridgeshire:  (Through waves, through fields)
 Cheshire:  (By the right and dignity of the sword)
 Cornwall:  (One and all)
 Cumberland:  (I carry through)
 Derbyshire:  (By good counsel)
 Devon:  (By divine aid)
 Durham: Faith, foresight and industry
 Dorset: Who's Afear'd
 Essex: Many minds, one heart
 Gloucestershire:  (Ever forward)
 Hampshire: 
 Herefordshire:  (This fair land is the gift of God)
 Hertfordshire: Trust and fear not
 Huntingdonshire:  (By work everything flourishes)
 Kent:  (Unconquered)
 Lancashire:  (In counsel is wisdom)
 Leicestershire: For'ard For'ard
 Lincolnshire:  (Perseverance conquers)
 Middlesex:
 Norfolk:
 Northamptonshire:  (The Rose—Emblem of Harmony)
 Northumberland: Northumberland
 Nottinghamshire:  (Progress with wisdom)
 Oxfordshire:  (Dare to be wise)
 Rutland:  (Much in little)
 Shropshire:  (Let Salop flourish)
 Somerset:  (All the people of Somerset)
 Staffordshire: The knot unites
 Suffolk:  (Direct our work)
 Surrey:
 Sussex: We wunt be druv (Sussaxon dialect: We won't be driven)
 Warwickshire: United to serve
 Westmorland:
 Yorkshire, East Riding: Tradition and Progress
 Yorkshire, North Riding:
 Yorkshire, West Riding:  (Heed counsel)
 Wiltshire:
 Worcestershire:

Ceremonial
 Bristol:  (Virtue and hard work)
 Cumbria:  (I shall lift up mine eyes unto the mountains)
 East Sussex:
 Greater London:
 Greater Manchester: Ever Vigilant
 Isle of Wight: All this beauty is of God
 Merseyside: Unity in the Service of All
 North Yorkshire:  (Stronger by union)
 South Yorkshire: Each shall strive for the Welfare of All
 Tyne and Wear: 
 West Midlands: Forward in Unity
 West Sussex: 
 West Yorkshire: By Effort Achieve

Former
 Avon:
 Cleveland: Endeavour
 Hereford and Worcester: 
 Humberside: United we Flourish

Scotland
 Aberdeen: Bon Accord
 Angus:  (Trust in Angus)
 Ayr: God Shaw the Right
 Banff:  (With hope and courage)
 Caithness: Commit thy Wark to God
 Clackmannan: Leuk aboot ye
 Dumfries:
 Dunbarton:  (Land of the elm trees)
 East Lothian:
 Fife:  (By virtue and by industry)
 Inverness:  (For the good of the county)
 Kincardine:  (Praise to God)
 Kinross: For all Time
 Kirkcudbright: 
 Lanark: 
 Midlothian:
 Moray:  (In hope)
 Nairn: Unite and be Mindful
 Orkney:  (Home to the winds, friend of the sea)
 Peebles:  (There is increase by swimming against the stream
 Perth:  (For law and liberty)
 Renfrew:
 Ross and Cromarty: Dread God and Do Well
 Roxburgh:  (Yield not to misfortunes [evil things] but go on more boldly against them)
 Selkirk:
 Stirling:
 Sutherland:  (Cling to thy heritage with diligence)
 West Lothian: Aye for the Common Weal
 Wigtown:
 Zetland:  (With laws shall this land be built)

Wales

Traditional
 Anglesey:  (Anglesey mother of Wales)
 Brecknock:  (Unity, peace, prosperity)
 Caernarfon:  (The strength of Gwynedd)
 Carmarthen:  (A free people a prosperous country)
 Cardigan or Ceredigion:  (A nation's wealth is freedom)
 Denbigh:  (God is sufficient)
 Flint:  (The best shield is justice)
 Glamorgan:  (He that endureth, overcometh)
 Merioneth or Merionydd:  (While the sea lasts, so shall Merionethshire)
 Monmouth:  (Faithful to both)
 Montgomery:  (Powys paradise of Wales)
 Pembroke:  (Out of unity is strength)
 Radnor:  (Higher and higher)

Ceremonial
 Clwyd:  (The shield of justice is God)
 Dyfed:  (A free people, a prosperous country) - as Carmarthenshire
 Gwent:  (Faithful to both) - as Monmouthshire
 Gwynedd:  (The strength of Gwynedd) - as Caernarfonshire
 Mid Glamorgan:  (He who suffers, conquers) - as Glamorgan
 Powys:  (Unity and freedom)
 South Glamorgan:  (The city and the vale) 
 West Glamorgan:  (The just are strong)

Mottos of the Livery Companies of the City of London

Educational institutions

See also
List of U.S. state and territory mottos
List of national mottos
List of university and college mottos
List of sundial mottos
List of United States Armed Forces unit mottoes
:Category:Latin mottos
:Category:Lists of mottos

References

External links
 Mottos in heraldry (over 2000)

 
!